"Stargazing" is a song by the Norwegian DJ and record producer Kygo. It features vocals of American singer Justin Jesso. The song was written by Kygo, Justin Jesso, Stuart Crichton and Jamie Hartman.  The song was co-produced by Kygo, Stuart Crichton and Jamie Hartman.

Released on 22 September 2017 as the title track from Kygo's 2017 EP of the same name, it was the third single from the EP after "It Ain't Me" released on 17 February 2017 and "First Time" released on 28 April 2017. Kygo premiered the song in August 2017 during the Judgenfest festival in Norway.

Music video
The music video was released on 26 September 2017 on Kygo's YouTube channel. It was directed by Philip R. Lopez. Described by Billboard as "emotional", the song shows a little boy making his own rocket in the quest of chasing his recently deceased father. The boy finds a note saying "You will always find me in the stars.- Love, Dad". The boy theorizes that he could meet his dad in the stars so he took help of various people but he did not inform his mother as he was scared that his mission would be stopped. As Justin Jesso's voice gets strong, the boy reaches his quest. But however his mom was informed about the boy's invention by one of the people that helped the boy. She was disappointed and feared to lose her son too, however the boy told her that he would always be in the stars. The mother cried and agreed to let her son accomplish his mission to chase his dad, so they release the rocket ship in the backyard with all the various people that helped the boy accompanying them. It was then that the woman faced her fear and she is left lonely.

Track listing 
Digital download – orchestral version
 "Stargazing" (orchestral version) (featuring Justin Jesso and Bergen Philharmonic Orchestra) – 3:50

Digital download – Kaskade remix
 "Stargazing" (Kaskade remix) – 3:03

Charts

Weekly charts

Year-end charts

Certifications

References

2017 singles
2017 songs
Justin Jesso songs
Kygo songs
Song recordings produced by Kygo
Songs written by Jamie Hartman
Songs written by Justin Jesso
Songs written by Kygo
Songs written by Stuart Crichton